The 1974 World Cup took place 21–24 November at the Lagunita Country Club in Caracas, Venezuela. It was the 22nd World Cup event. The tournament was a 72-hole stroke play team event with 46 teams. Each team consisted of two players from a country. The combined score of each team determined the team results. The South Africa team of  Bobby Cole and Dale Hayes won by five strokes over the Japan team of Isao Aoki and Masashi Ozaki. The individual competition for the International Trophy, was won by Cole, five strokes ahead Ozaki. 

Dale Hayes, just 22 years of age and Cole, being 26, became the youngest pair ever to win the World Cup, formerly named the Canada Cup. It was the second victory for South Africa in the history of the event, since Gary Player and Harold Henning won the tournament for South Africa in 1965.

Teams 

Source:

Scores
Team

International Trophy

Sources:

References

World Cup (men's golf)
Golf tournaments in Venezuela
Sports competitions in Caracas
World Cup
World Cup golf